Feleti Penitala Teo OBE (born 9 October 1962) is a Tuvaluan lawyer and civil servant. He is the son of Sir Fiatau Penitala Teo who was appointed as the first Governor General of Tuvalu (1978–1986) following independence from Great Britain.

In December 2014 at the 11th regular session of the WCPFC in Apia, Samoa, he was appointed the executive director of the Western and Central Pacific Fisheries Commission (WCPFC). He was a former acting Secretary General of the Pacific Islands Forum (2008). Teo has also served as Attorney General of Tuvalu (1991-2000) and Director General of the Forum Fishery Agency (2000-2006).

Education 
Feleti Teo received his Bachelor of Laws degree from the University of Canterbury in Christchurch, New Zealand, and a Master of Laws degree in Public Law from Australian National University in Canberra, Australia. In 1986, he became the first Tuvaluan to qualify as a lawyer upon being admitted as a barrister and solicitor of the High Court of New Zealand.

Career 
Teo was the first Tuvaluan to serve as the Attorney General of Tuvalu and Head of Legal and Judicial Services of Tuvalu From 1991 to 2000. His predecessors were expatriates John Wilson, Neil Davidson, Beith Atkinson and David Ballantyne respectively (1978-1991). During Teo's tenure, Cameron Dick served as the Acting Attorney General of Tuvalu from 1995 to 1996 while Teo undertook postgraduate studies at the Australian National University in Canberra. Iakoba Italeli succeeded Teo as the Attorney General of Tuvalu in 2002.

From 2000 to 2006, he was Director General of the Pacific Islands Forum Fisheries Agency (FFA), based in Honiara, Solomon Islands. From 2007 to 2013 he served as Deputy Secretary General of the Pacific Islands Forum (PIF), headquartered in Fiji. During this period he was also acting Secretary General of the Pacific Islands Forum (2008), due to the illness and subsequent death of its Secretary General, Greg Urwin of Australia.

In 2014, Teo was appointed interim secretary general for the newly established regional organisation, the Pacific Islands Development Forum (PIDF), which he held until his appointment to the WCPFC. (The other two nominees for secretary general were Wilkie Rasmussen, the foreign minister of the Cook Islands, and Tuiloma Neroni Slade, the former attorney general of Samoa and former justice of the International Criminal Court. Ultimately, Slade was chosen as the next secretary general at the Pacific Islands Forum meeting in Niue, while Teo was appointed to head the WCPFC Secretariat as executive director in December 2014.

Teo was appointed Officer of the Order of the British Empire (OBE) in the 2013 Birthday Honours for services to government.

References

Secretaries General of the Pacific Islands Forum
Tuvaluan diplomats
University of Canterbury alumni
Australian National University alumni
Attorneys General of Tuvalu
Living people
1962 births
Officers of the Order of the British Empire